The Hajdú-Bihar County Assembly is the local legislative body of Hajdú-Bihar County in Hungary. After the elections in 2019, it consists 24 councillors, and is controlled by the Fidesz which has 16 councillors, versus 3 Jobbik, 2 Democratic Coalition, 2 Momentum Movement and 1 Hungarian Socialist Party councillors.

References

Local government in Hungary
Hajdú-Bihar County